The Daily Front Row is a fashion industry publication, commonly known as The Daily. Brandusa Niro is the editor-in-chief. In 2011, Niro bought a controlling interest in the magazine, which was formerly owned by IMG.

Niro founded The Daily in November 2002, with the first issue launching for New York Fashion Week in February of the following year. The Daily is distributed every day during Mercedes-Benz Fashion Week in New York, chronicling the goings-on from the front rows to behind the scenes. The magazine is distributed for free at the site of Fashion Week. For the remainder of the year, the online magazine is updated every weekday with fashion news, party reports, features, and The Dailys blog, Chic Report. In an article in Vanity Fair, her friend Graydon Carter, the magazine's editor, called The Daily "the guiltiest pleasure of Fashion Week in New York".

The Daily also produces print issues during Mercedes-Benz Fashion Week Swim in Miami, and has produced issues for Fashion Weeks in Sydney, Australia; Toronto, Canada; Moscow, Russia; and Mexico City, Mexico. In addition, The Daily produces issues covering various fashion trade shows, including Coterie, WSA, and Collective.

In December 2009, The Daily branched out from fashion for the first time to produce a special issue for Art Basel Miami. In May 2010, three issues were produced for the Tribeca Film Festival.

Fashion Los Angeles Awards
In 2015, the magazine created the Fashion Los Angeles Awards to honor the best in fashion in Hollywood. Honorees included Carine Roitfeld in 2015 and Stephen Gan in 2017.

References

External links

Daily Front Row (alternative URL)

Fashion magazines published in the United States
Magazines established in 2002
Magazines published in New York City
Women's magazines published in the United States
Women's fashion magazines